The Czechoslovak National Democracy, called also Czechoslovak National Democratic Party, was a First Republic right-wing political party in Czechoslovakia.

History
The party was established in 1918 by a merger of the Free-minded National Party ("Young Czechs") and several smaller parties such as the State's Rights Progressives, Moravian Progressive Party, and the Moravian-Silesian People's Party. It was initially known as the Czech Constitutional Democratic Party. It formed the first provisional government led by Karel Kramář, and the following year it was renamed the National Democracy.

In 1935 the party merged with the National League and the National Front to form the National Unification.

Electoral results

See also
Národní sdružení odborových organizací - the labour wing of the party
:Category:Czechoslovak National Democracy politicians

References

Political parties in Czechoslovakia
1918 establishments in Czechoslovakia
Political parties established in 1918
Political parties disestablished in 1935
National conservative parties
National liberal parties
Nationalist parties in Europe